Pagria varians is a species of leaf beetle distributed in East Africa (Kenya, Tanzania), the Democratic Republic of the Congo (Garamba and Upemba National Parks), South Sudan, and Ivory Coast. It was described by Édouard Lefèvre in 1884. Its host plants include Combretum spp.

References

Eumolpinae
Beetles of Africa
Beetles of the Democratic Republic of the Congo
Beetles described in 1884
Insects of Kenya
Insects of Tanzania
Insects of Sudan
Insects of West Africa
Taxa named by Édouard Lefèvre